A Boxful of Treasures is a 2004 compilation box set of recordings by folk singer Sandy Denny and comprises solo material and recordings made during her time as a member of Fotheringay, Fairport Convention, and other groups. The fifth CD contains previously unreleased tracks, most of which are demos recorded at Denny's home.

Track listing 
All songs are credited to Sandy Denny except where noted.

Disc one

Disc two

Disc three

Disc four

Disc five

References 

 Profile on CDRoots.com
 The Bees Knees, notes by compiler

Sandy Denny albums
2004 compilation albums